Anolis delafuentei, also known commonly as the Escambray crested anole and the Guamuhaya anole, is a species of lizard in the family Dactyloidae. The species is endemic to Cuba.

Etymology
The specific name, delafuentei, is in honor of Argentinian herpetological paleontologist Marcelo S. de la Fuente.

Habitat

Description

Reproduction
A. delafuentei is oviparous.

Taxonomy
A. delafuentei is a member of the A. sagrei species group.

References

Further reading
Garrido OH (1982). "Nueva especie de Anolis (Lacertilia, Iguanidae) para Cuba". Doñana, Acta Vertebrata 9: 131–137. (Anolis delafuentei, new species). (in Spanish).
Nicholson KE (2002). "Phylogenetic analysis and a test of the current infrageneric classification of Norops (beta Anolis)". Herpetological Monographs 16 (1): 93–120. (Norops delafuentei, new combination).
Rodríguez Schettino L (editor) (1999). The Iguanid Lizards of Cuba. Gainesville: University Press of Florida (formerly University of Florida Press). 428 pp. . (Anolis delafuentei, p. 368).
Schwartz A, Henderson RW (1991). Amphibians and Reptiles of the West Indies: Descriptions, Distributions, and Natural History. Gainesville: University of Florida Press. 720 pp. . (Anolis delafuentei, p. 251).

Anoles
Endemic fauna of Cuba
Reptiles of Cuba
Reptiles described in 1982
Taxa named by Orlando H. Garrido